Prince Hieronim Florian Radziwiłł Polish pronunciation (hjeroni:m flɒri:æn rædʒi:vi:w ) (1715–1760) was a Polish–Lithuanian  szlachcic.

He was Podczaszy of Lithuania since 1739, Great Chorąży of Lithuania since 1750 and starost of Przemyśl and Krzyczew.

He married Teresa Sapieha on 9 September 1740, Magdalena Czapska in October 1745 in Warsaw and Aniela Miączyńska on 1 January 1755.

1715 births
1760 deaths
Hieronim Florian
People from Biała Podlaska